Jawan TV is private  TV channel in Afghanistan.

Programs

TV Shows
 Prison Break  (فرار از زندان)
 Karagül             (گل سیاه)
 küçük Gelin    (عروس خوردسال)
 Medcezir             (قصه عشق)
 Kaderimin Yazıldığı Gün         (سرنوشت)

See also
 Television in Afghanistan

References

External links
 

Television stations in Afghanistan
Mass media in Kabul